Marc Lock (born 21 June 1991) is an Australian rules footballer who played for the Gold Coast Football Club in the Australian Football League (AFL). He currently plays for the Box Hill Hawks Football Club in the Victorian Football League (VFL).

Originally from Adelaide, Lock moved to Queensland and ultimately played for Southport as a junior. He was recruited to the newly established Gold Coast Football Club as a zone selection at the end of 2008. Lock was made the inaugural captain of the club, and served as captain for the club's two formative seasons: 2009, when the club competed in the TAC Cup under-18s competition, and 2010, when the club competed in the VFL senior competition. He won the club best and fairest in its TAC Cup season.

When Gold Coast joined the AFL for the 2011 season, Gary Ablett, Jr. took over the captaincy from Lock. Lock made his debut in Gold Coast's first game, playing against Carlton in round 2, 2011, but did not play another senior game for the Suns and was delisted at the end of the season.

Lock moved to Melbourne in 2012 to play with the VFL's Box Hill Hawks Football Club. As of 2015, Lock has played a total of 61 games for Box Hill.

Statistics

|- style="background-color: #EAEAEA"
! scope="row" style="text-align:center" | 2011
|
| 1 || 1 || 0 || 0 || 6 || 2 || 8 || 2 || 0 || 0.0 || 0.0 || 6.0 || 2.0 || 8.0 || 2.0 || 0.0
|- class="sortbottom"
! colspan=3| Career
! 1
! 0
! 0
! 6
! 2
! 8
! 2
! 0
! 0.0
! 0.0
! 6.0
! 2.0
! 8.0
! 2.0
! 0.0
|}

References

External links

1991 births
Living people
Gold Coast Football Club players
Box Hill Football Club players
Australian rules footballers from South Australia